TVP1 (TVP Jeden, Program I Telewizji Polskiej, "Jedynka") is the main public television channel of TVP (Telewizja Polska S.A.), Poland's national television broadcaster. It was the first Polish channel to be broadcast and remains one of the most popular today. TVP1 was launched 25 October 1952.

History
TVP1 was launched as of 25 October 1952 as TV Polska. The tests resumed in the immediate post-war years and materialized in October 1952 with the launch of the first experimental broadcasts of Polish television. In January 1953, it broadcasts at the rate of half an hour per week, then an hour and a half in March. The schedule of programmes continued to grow and the broadcast time increased to 22 hours per week in 1957, 26 hours in 1958.

Regional studios were added to those in Szczecin and Warsaw in 1956. These were first those of Łódź, Katowice (1957), Poznań (1958) and Gdańsk (1960). Some emblematic programs were born at the end of the 1950s, such as "Telewizyjny Kurier Warszawski" (Warsaw TV News) or the cultural magazine "Pegaz".

An HD feed was launched in January 2011 as a test broadcast. In June 2012, TVP1 HD was officially launched with the coverage of the UEFA Euro 2012

Current line-up

News show
 Teleexpress - runs at 17:00 CET.
 Wiadomości - main news at 19:30 CET.

Talk show/Reporters
 Sprawa dla reportera (The case for a reporter) - intervention program hosted by Elżbieta Jaworowicz
 Kwadrans polityczny (Political quarter of an hour) - morning political talk show
 Warto rozmawiać (It is worth to talk) - controversial talk show, accused of right-wing spinning, hosted by Jan Pospieszalski
 Magazyn śledczy Anity Gargas - investigative magazine
 ALARM! - reporters' magazine
 Magazyn Kryminalny 997 (Crime Magazine 997)

Polish series

Foreign series
 Muhteşem Yüzyıl: Kösem (Magnificent Century: Kösem) - in Polish "Wspaniałe stulecie: Sułtanka Kösem"
 A.D. The Bible Continues - in Polish "Anno Domini - Biblii ciąg dalszy"
 Homeland
 The Walking Dead - in Polish "Żywe trupy"
 Downton Abbey
 La dama velata (The veiled lady) - in Polish "Dama w czarnym welonie"
 Transporter: The Series
 The Pillars of the Earth - in Polish "Filary Ziemi"
 Chicago Fire
 Revenge - in Polish "Zemsta"
 The Tudors - in Polish "Dynastia Tudorów"
 FlashForward - in Polish "Przebłysk jutra"
 Body of Proof - in Polish "Anatomia prawdy"
 Lost - in Polish "Zagubieni"
 Dirty Sexy Money - in Polish "Seks, Kasa i Kłopoty"
 Legend of the Seeker - in Polish "Miecz Prawdy"
 Brothers & Sisters - in Polish "Bracia i siostry"
 Psych - in Polish "Świry"
 Glee
 Rome - in Polish "Rzym"
 Moonlight - in Polish "Pod Osłoną Nocy"
 Six Degrees - in Polish "Sześć Stóp Oddalenia"
 Star Wars: The Clone Wars (2008 TV series) - in Polish "Gwiezdne wojny - Wojny klonów"
 Kyle XY
 Hannah Montana
 Dragon Hunters - in Polish "Łowcy smoków"
 Elif

Entertainment
 Jaka to melodia? - the Polish version of Name That Tune
 Rolnik szuka żony - the Polish version of Farmer Wants a Wife
 Wielki Test - a big TV show with famous people and other participants, quiz about the history, science (each program has a different theme)
 The Wall. Wygraj marzenia - the Polish version of The Wall
 Jeden z dziesięciu - the Polish version of Fifteen to One.
 Rodzina wie lepiej - the Polish version of Israeli game show Sure or Insure
 Hit, Hit, Hurra - music talent show for kids
 Firmowe ewolucje - economics show about the small and medium-sized enterprises, in cooperation with Bank Zachodni WBK
 National Festival of Polish Song in Opole
 Eurovision Song Contest
 Junior Eurovision Song Contest

Sports
 UEFA Champions League (one match on Wednesdays, highlights and final)
 2024 Olympic Games
 2022 FIFA World Cup
 UEFA Euro 2024
 UEFA Nations League 
 the Polish national football team's matches
 LOTTO Ekstraklasa 
 FIS Ski Jumping World Cup
 Tour de Pologne
 IAAF World Championships in Athletics
 European Athletics Championships

Previously on TVP1

Polish TV series
Plebania (Presbytery)
Dom nad rozlewiskiem (House on water levels)
Miłość nad rozlewiskiem (Love on water levels)
Życie nad rozlewiskiem (Life on water levels)
Nad rozlewiskiem (On water levels) 
Cisza nad rozlewiskiem (Silence on water levels)
Pensjonat nad rozlewiskiem (Pension on water levels)
Londyńczycy (The Londoners)
Ratownicy (Lifeguards)
Tak czy nie (Yes or no)
Tygrysy Europy (Tigers of Europe)
Chichot losu (Cheesy fate)
1920. Wojna i miłość (1920. War & Love)
Determinator
Siła wyższa (Force majeure)
Galeria (CentoVetrine)
Dekalog
Uwikłani (Entangled)
Bodo
Strażacy (Firefighters)
Ranczo (Ranch)
Komisja morderstw (Commission of Murders)
Komisariat (Police station)
Drogi wolności (Dear freedom)
Dziewczyny ze Lwowa (Girls from Lviv)
Młody Piłsudski (Young Piłsudski)
Wojenne dziewczyny (War Girls)

Foreign series
JAG - in Polish "JAG - Wojskowe Biuro Śledcze"
Kojak
Jake and the Fatman - in Polish "Gliniarz i prokurator"
Nash Bridges
Baywatch - in Polish "Słoneczny patrol"
Fireman Sam - in Polish "Strażak Sam"
Frasier
Everybody Loves Raymond - in Polish "Wszyscy kochają Raymonda"
The Lost Room - in Polish "Zagubiony pokój"
The District - in Polish "Bez pardonu" ("Without mercy")
Lipstick Jungle - in Polish "Szminka w Wielkim Mieście"
Crusoe
The 4400
Doctor Who
Heroes - in Polish "Herosi"
Terminator: The Sarah Connor Chronicles - in Polish "Terminator: Kroniki Sary Connor"
Royal Pains - in Polish "Bananowy Doktor"
Knight Rider - in Polish "Nieustraszony"
Harper's Island - in Polish "Wyspa Harpera"
Muhteşem Yüzyıl (Magnificent Century) - in Polish "Wspaniałe stulecie"
The Bold and the Beautiful - in Polish "Moda na Sukces"
Wizards of Waverly Place - in Polish "Czarodzieje z Waverly Place"
Backyardigans (in Polish Przyjaciele z podwórka)

Entertainment
Miliard w rozumie (Billion in mind)
Randka w ciemno (The Dating Game)
Śmiechu warte (America's Funniest Home Videos)
Lidzbarskie Wieczory Humoru i Satyry

Logos and identities

TVP1 HD

See also
Telewizja Polska
Television in Poland
Eastern Bloc information dissemination

External links

 Official website 

Eastern Bloc mass media
Telewizja Polska
Television channels and stations established in 1952
Television channels in Poland
.